Aislin Jones (born February 2000) is a women's skeet shooter from Australia. She won the Australian National Championship in January 2016, becoming the youngest woman ever to hold that title.  She is the current Oceania Region Junior Women's Skeet Record holder.

Education
In 2018 Jones is completing her Victorian Certificate of Education at Nagle College in Bairnsdale, Victoria Australia.

Career

Early and domestic
Jones developed an interest in shooting while following her father David Jones, around the Bairnsdale Field and Game clay target range from an early age. She started shooting in 2012 and switched from simulated field to skeet later that year.  Jones competed in her first Australian Clay Target Association (ACTA) national championships at the age of 13, held at Wagga Wagga in 2013.  The following year Jones won six medals at the ACTA national championships at Wagga Wagga and the National Women's Champion of Champions in the mixed 12 gauge/20 gauge event with a score of 99/100.

In late 2014 Jones switched from American Skeet to ISSF skeet in order to achieve her Olympic and Commonwealth Games aspirations.  At her first competitive ISSF skeet shoot in October 2014, she won the Victorian Ladies' Championship at Werribee Clay Target Club.

International
In 2015 Jones competed in her first international competition, finishing 23rd in the junior world championships and 6th in the ISSF junior cup.  In early 2016 she became the youngest winner of the Australian National Skeet Championship at the age of 15.

Jones represented Australia in Women's Skeet at the Rio Olympic Games in 2016, finishing in 17th place. JONES was the second youngest Australian athlete, and the youngest of the 390 shooting athletes from around the world.  At 16 years of age, she was also the youngest Australian shooter ever to compete at any Olympic Games.

In October 2017 Jones broke the Oceania Women's Skeet, junior and senior records and in January 2018, at the Australian Nationals in Echuca she won the Commonwealth championship, Australian Championship and High Gun.

In March 2018 she won her first ISSF gold medal at the Junior World Cup in Sydney.

Jones has been named in the Australian shooting team for the 2018 Commonwealth Games and finished 6th, after finishing second in the qualifying round.

Personal life

She lives in Lakes Entrance, in southeast Victoria.

Awards

 Gippsland Sports Academy Gippstar Award 2017.
 East Gippsland Shire Young Citizen of the Year 2018, for outstanding contribution to her sport.

References

External links 
  of TeamAislin.com
 
 
 
 
 

Skeet shooters
Australian female sport shooters
2000 births
Living people
Place of birth missing (living people)
Shooters at the 2016 Summer Olympics
Olympic shooters of Australia
21st-century Australian women